Goderich United is a Sierra Leonean football club based in Goderich, a suburb of Freetown, Sierra Leone. The Goderich United is currently playing in the Sierra Leone National First Division, the second highest football league.

External links
http://www.rsssf.com/tabless/sier07.html
Football clubs in Sierra Leone